Schlesser is a surname. Notable people with the surname include:

Émile V. Schlesser (born 1986), Luxembourgish film director, screenwriter, composer, and multimedia artist
Jean-Louis Schlesser (born 1947), French racing driver
Jo Schlesser (1928–1968), French racing driver